Gyamco Township is a township of Tingri, Tibet Autonomous Region. Its downtown area, Guore village, also referred as Gyaco in English, is a village in the Tibet Autonomous Region of China.

See also
List of towns and villages in Tibet

Populated places in Shigatse
Township-level divisions of Tibet
Tingri County